TV Squash was a British television satire show which was made by Yorkshire Television and ran for one series during the summer of 1992. Each of the six episodes parodied a day's television on a particular channel, squeezing the contents into half an hour. The weekday programming of all four main British television channels of the time (BBC One, BBC Two, ITV and Channel 4) was satirised in the first four episodes, while episodes five and six concentrated on a typical day's viewing on Saturday and Sunday on ITV.

External links 

 

1992 British television series debuts
1992 British television series endings
Television series by Yorkshire Television